Plumstead Valley is a valley at the northern end of Shipton Ridge, east of Kirkaldy Spur in the Allan Hills, Oates Land. Reconnoitered by the New Zealand Antarctic Research Program (NZARP) Allan Hills Expedition, 1964. They named it after Dr. E.P. Plumstead for her work on Glossopteris fossils, especially those from Antarctica.

Valleys of Oates Land